Barbara is a given name used in numerous languages. It is the feminine form of the Greek word barbaros meaning "stranger" or "foreign".

In Roman Catholic and Greek Orthodox tradition, Saint Barbara (Greek: Ἁγία Βαρβάρα) was martyred by her father, who was then punished with death by lightning. As such, St Barbara is a protectress against fire and lightning. Early Christians occasionally referred to themselves as "barbarians" in opposition to the pagan Romans and Greeks.

Today, the name Barbara or its variants are commonly given to female babies born in such countries as Chile, the Czech Republic, Estonia, Georgia, Hungary, Poland, Slovakia, and Russia, among others. It was among the most popular names for girls in English-speaking countries in the first half of the 20th century but has since decreased in usage in countries such as the United States.

In Italy, Barbara was particularly popular during the 1970s: it was among the top 10 names given to girls born from 1969 to 1977, rising to 2nd place (behind Maria) in 1971. In the same year it was the most common name for girls born in Rome and in Bologna.

Variants
Babara (Hawaiian)
Babbie (English)
Baiba (Latvian)
Baibín (Irish Gaelic)
Bairbre (Irish Gaelic)
Bára (Czech)
Barabal (Scottish Gaelic)
Barb (name) (English)
Barba (Faroese)
Bàrbara (Catalan)
Bárbara (Galician, Portuguese, Spanish)
Barbara (Croatian, English, French, German, Hungarian, Italian, Polish, Slovene)
Barbare (Georgian)
Barbary (English)
Bärbel (German)
Barbera (Italian, old Florentine variant)
Barbie (English)
Barbo (Norwegian)
Barbora (Czech, Lithuanian, Slovak)
Barborka (Slovak), (Czech)
Barbra (English)
Barbro (Norwegian, Swedish)
Barbuš, Baruš (Czech)
Barby (English)
Barča (Czech)
Barunka (Czech)
Baruška (Czech)
Basia (Polish)
Baśka (Polish)
Basieńka (Polish)
Berber (West Frisian)
Borbála (Hungarian)
Varvara (Bulgarian, Greek)
Βαρβάρα (Varvara), (Greek)
Варвара (Varvara), (Russian, Ukrainian)
Варя (Varya), (Russian, Ukrainian hypocorism)

People with the given name Barbara (or variants)
Barbara (1930–1997; stage name of Monique Andrée Serf), French singer
Saint Barbara, early Christian martyr
Barbara of Austria (1539–1572), Archduchess of Austria
Barbara of Brandenburg (1464–1515), Queen consort of Bohemia and Hungary
Barbara of Cilli (1392–1451), Queen of Hungary, Germany and Bohemia, Empress of Holy Roman Empire
Barbara of Hesse (1536–1597), Duchess of Württemberg-Mömpelgard 
Barbara of Portugal (1711–1758), Queen Consort of Spain
Barbara Abart (born 1985), Italian luger
Barbara Abbott (born 1943), American linguist
Barbara Acklin (1943–1998), American soul singer
Barbara Adams (born 1951), Pennsylvania attorney and politician
Barbara Adams (1945–2002), British historian and Egyptologist
Barbara Adams (born 1962), Canadian politician
Barbara Aigner (born 2005), Austrian para-alpine skier
Varvara Akritidou (born 1981), Greek judoka
Barbra Amesbury (born 1948), formerly Bill Amesbury, Canadian singer-songwriter, composer and filmmaker
Barbara Angus (1924–2005), New Zealand diplomat and historian
Barbara Auer (born 1959), German actress 
Barbara Avedon (1925–1994), television writer
Barbara Ayrton-Gould (1886–1950), British politician and suffragist
Barbara Bach (born 1947), American actress
Barbara Bailey (1910–2003), British nun (Sister Mary Barbara Bailey), artist, and illustrator
Barbara Evelyn Bailey (born 1942), Jamaican educator and gender studies advocate
Barbara Bailey (born 1944), American politician
Barbara Bailey (Connecticut Four), American librarian and activist 
Barbara Bain  (born 1931), American actress
Barbara Ball (1924–2011), Bermudian politician
Barbara Ballard (born 1944), American politician
Bárbara Micheline do Monte Barbosa (born 1988), known as Bárbara, Brazilian footballer
Barbara Barrie (born 1931), American actress
Barbara Bartuś (born 1967), Polish politician
Barbara Bates (1925–1969), American actress
Barbara Bates (1928–2002), American physician, author and historian
Barbara Berlusconi (born 1984), Italian business executive
Barbara Bestor (born 1969), American architect based in Los Angeles
Barbara Bohannan-Sheppard (born 1950), American politician
Barbara Boxer (born 1940), American politician (US House Representative & US Senator, D-CA) 
Barbara Bush (1925–2018), First Lady of the United States (1989–1993)
Bárbara Cabrera (born 1996), Argentine fashion model and beauty pageant titleholder who was appointed Miss Universe Argentina 2022
Barbara Calder (1924–2018), British yachtswoman
Barbara Carrera (born 1945), Nicaraguan-American actress
Dame Barbara Cartland (1901–2000), English novelist
Barbara Castle, Baroness Castle of Blackburn (1910–2002), British politician
Barbara Chase-Riboud, American visual artist and sculptor (born 1939)
Barbara Creecy (born 1958), South African politician
Barbara Colby (1939–1975), American actress
Barbara Comstock (born 1959), American attorney, lobbyist, and politician
Barbara Comyns (1907–1992), English writer and artist
Barbara Corcoran (born 1949), American entrepreneur
Barbara Dawson (born 1957), Irish art historian, museum gallery director, author, curator
Barbara Dex (born 1974), Belgian singer
Barbara Dickson (born 1947), British singer
Barbara Dittrich (born 1964), American politician
Barbara Dunkelman (born 1989), Canadian-born actress and internet personality
Barbara Eden (born 1931), American actress
Barbara Ehrenreich (1941–2022), American author and political activist
Barbara Ercolano, Italian astrophysicist
Barbro Eriksdotter (Bielke) (died 1553), Swedish noble
Varvara Fasoi (born 1991), Greek road cyclist
Barbara Fei (1931–2017), Hong Kong soprano opera singer
Barbara Feldon (born 1933), American actress
Barbara Figueroa, American chef
Varvara Filiou (born 1994), Greek rhythmic gymnast and coach
barbara findlay, Canadian lawyer
Barbara Flaminia (1540–1586), Italian stage actress
Barbara Floridia (born 1977), Italian politician
Barbara Freyberg, Baroness Freyberg (1887–1973), British peeress
Barbara Frittoli (born 1967), Italian opera singer
Dame Barbara Frost (born 1952), British charity executive
Barbara Frum (1937–1992), Canadian broadcast journalist
Barbara Fugger (1419–1497), German banker
Barbara Fuld, better known as Bracha Fuld (1926–1946), German-born Jewish resistance fighter
Barbra Fuller (born 1921), American actress and centenarian
Barbara Galpin (1855–1922), American journalist
Barbara Gibbs Golffing (1912–1993), American poet and translator
Barbara Gibson, Canadian diplomat
Barbara Gibson (born 1962), American-born British politician and academic
Barbara Gordon, American documentary filmmaker and author
Barbara Hale (1922–2017), American actress
Barbara Hanley (1882–1959), Canadian politician
Barbara Harris, various individuals with same or similar names
Barbara Hendricks (born 1948), African-American operatic soprano
Barbara Hendricks (politician) (born 1952), German politician, Minister of Finance
Dame Barbara Hepworth (1903–1975), British artist and sculptor
Barbara Hershey (born 1948), American actress
Barbara Howard (1920–2017), Canadian sprinter
Barbara Hutton (1912–1979), American heiress
Barbara Elisabeth van Houten (1863–1950), Dutch painter
Barbara Jackman (born 1950), Canadian lawyer
Barbara Janke (born 1947), British politician
Barbara Jefford (1930-2020), British actress
Barbara Jelić-Ružić (born 1977), Croatian volleyball player
Barbara Nation, known as Barbara Jones, Jamaican singer 
Barbara Jones (sprinter) (born 1937), American sprinter
Barbara S. Jones (born 1947), former United States district judge of the United States District Court for the Southern District of New York
Barbara Jordan (1936–1996), American politician
Barbara Jordan (poet) (born 1949), American poet
Barbara Jordan (tennis) (born 1957), American tennis player
Barbara Joscelyne (born 1959), British Paralympian athlete
Barbara Kalik (born 1936), American politician
Barbara Karinska (1886–1983), Ukrainian costumer of the New York City Ballet
Barbara Karlich (born 1969), Austrian television presenter
Barbara Kavovit, American socialite 
Barbara Kay (born 1943), Canadian columnist
Barbara Keeley (born 1952), British politician
Barbara Keiler, pen name Judith Arnold (born 1953), American writer
Barbara Kellerman (born 1949), British actress
Barbara Kendall (born 1967), boardsailor from New Zealand
Barbara B. Kennelly (born 1936), American politician
Barbara Kent (1907–2011), American actress
Barbara Kingsolver (born 1955), American novelist and essayist
Barbara Klerk (born 1989), Belgian figure skater
Barbara Knox (born 1933), English actress
Barbora Kodetová (born 1970), Czech actress
Barbara Kolb (born 1939), American composer
Barbara Kopple (born 1946), American film director
Barbara La Marr (1896–1926), American actress
Barbara Lah (born 1972), Italian triple jumper
Barbara Lea (1929–2011), American actress and singer
Barbara Lee (born 1946), American politician
Barbara Levick (born 1931), British historian
Barbara Lezzi (born 1972), Italian politician
Barbara Liskov (born 1939), American computer scientist, recipient of the Turing Award
Barbara Longhi (1552–1638), Italian painter
Barbara de Loor (born 1974), Dutch speed skater
Barbara Mandrell (born 1948), American singer and musician
Barbara Joan March (born 1945), American criminal
Barbara Masini (born 1974), Italian politician
Barbara Matera (politician) (born 1981), Italian politician
Barbara Matera (costume designer) (1929–2001), British-born American costume and clothing designer
Barbara McAlister, various individuals with the same or similar names
Barbara McCauley, American romance writer
Barbara McClintock (1902–1992), American scientist
Barbara McNair (1934–2007), American singer and actress
Barbara Mensing (born 1960), German archer
Barbara Mikulski (born 1936), American politician
Barbara Mitcalfe (1928 – 2017), New Zealand conservationist, botanist and educator
Barbara Moore, various individuals with the same or similar names 
Barbara Nedeljáková (born 1979), Slovak actress
Barbara Nichols (1928–1976), American actress and sex symbol
Barbara Niedernhuber (born 1974), German luger
Barbara Oddone (born 1970), Italian tennis player
Barbara O'Neal, American novelist
Barbara O'Neil (1910–1980), American actress
Bárbara Palacios (born 1963), Venezuelan beauty queen
Barbara Palvin (born 1993), Hungarian model
Barbara Patton (born 1944), New York politician and university professor
Barbara Paulus (born 1970), Austrian tennis player
Barbara Pennington (born 1950s), American music artist
Barbara Peterson (born 1953), American philanthropist and former beauty pageant titleholder
Barbara Piwnik (born 1955), Polish judge and politician
Barbara Poma, founder of the Pulse nightclub, which experienced a mass shooting on June 12, 2016.
Barbara Pompili (born 1975), French politician
Barbara Potter (born 1961), Jordan's American compatriot and tennis player
Barbara Pravi (born 1993), French singer
Barbara Rafferty (born 1950), Scottish actress
Barbara Randolph (1942–2002), American soul singer
Barbara Radziwiłł (1520–1551), Queen of Poland
Barbara Rittner (born 1973), German tennis player
Barbara Riveros Diaz, Chilean triathlete
Barbara "Dusty" Roads (born 1928), labor activist and flight attendant
Barbara Roche (born 1954), British politician
Barbara Romagnan (born 1974), French politician and teacher
Barbara Ann Rowan (1938–2020), American attorney
Barbara Rudnik (1958–2009), German actress 
Dame Barbara Salt (1904–1975), British diplomat
Barbara Schett (born 1976), Austrian tennis player
Barbara Schöneberger (born 1974), German entertainer 
Barbara Schwartz (disambiguation), several people
Barbara Seidenath (born 1960), American metalsmith and jeweler
Barbara Schmid-Federer (born 1965), Swiss politician
Barbara Stanwyck (1907–1990), American actress
Barbara Steel (1857–1942), Scottish-South African suffragette
Barbra Streisand (born 1942), American singer and film and theatre actress
Barbara Strozzi (1619–1677), Italian Baroque singer and composer
Barbara Sturgeon, British broadcaster
Barbara Sukowa (born 1950), German actress
Barbara Thaler (born 1982), Austrian politician
Barbara Thenn (1519-1579) Austrian merchant and Münzmeister
Barbara Traub, American photographer
Barbara Tudek (1952–2019), biologist, professor who served as president of the Polish section of the European Environmental Mutagenesis and Genomics Society
Barbara "Basia" Trzetrzelewska (born 1954), Polish singer-songwriter and recording artist
Barbara Vernon (activist), Australian maternity activist and government lobbyist
Barbara Vernon (writer) (1916–1978), Australian playwright and screenwriter
Barbara Voss (born 1967), American historical archaeologist
Barbara Wagner (born 1938), Canadian figure skater
Barbara Walters (1929–2022), American journalist
Dame Barbara Ward, Lady Jackson, British economist and writer
Barbara Wasinger, American politician
Barbara Webster-Bourne, Anguillian Speaker of the National Assembly
Dame Barbara Windsor (1937–2020), English comedy and soap opera actress
Barbara Alyn Woods, American actress
Barbara Woodward (born 1961), British diplomat
Barbara Yeaman (born 1924), American conservationist
Barbara Yorke (born 1951), British historian
Barbara Young, various individuals with the same or similar names
Barbara Yung (1959–1985), Hong Kong actress
Barbara Zdunk (1769–1811), Polish alleged arsonist

See also
Varvara (disambiguation)

References

Given names
Italian feminine given names
English feminine given names
German feminine given names
Slovene feminine given names
French feminine given names
Polish feminine given names
Dutch feminine given names
Hungarian feminine given names
Swiss feminine given names
Greek feminine given names
Given names of Greek language origin